Stuart W. Hunt, Sr. (April 28, 1927 – December 9, 2014) was an American educator and politician.

Born in Brattleboro, Vermont, Hunt served in the United States Army Air Forces in 1945. In 1952, he received his bachelor's degree from Arnold College (Now University of Bridgeport) and taught at Brattleboro High School. Hunt lived in Guilford, Vermont. He was also in the insurance and real estate business. Hunt was a Republican. He served in the Vermont House of Representatives and then in the Vermont State Senate. He died in Vernon, Vermont.

Notes

1927 births
2014 deaths
People from Brattleboro, Vermont
People from Guilford, Vermont
United States Army Air Forces soldiers
University of Bridgeport alumni
Businesspeople from Vermont
Schoolteachers from Vermont
Republican Party members of the Vermont House of Representatives
Republican Party Vermont state senators
20th-century American businesspeople